Gaetano Arfé (12 November 1925, Somma Vesuviana – 13 September 2007) was an Italian politician, historian, and journalist. From 1966 to 1976 he published the Avanti!, the official newspaper of the Italian Socialist Party, whom he represented as a Member of the European Parliament (MEP) from 1979 to 1984. He died at the age of 81 on September 13, 2007 in Naples.

Political career 
In 1968, Arfé raised concerns about the anti-democratic radicalization of the Italian student movement.

Works
 Storia dell'Avanti! (1958)
 Storia del socialismo italiano 1892-1926 (1965)
 Storia delle idee politiche economiche e sociali (1972) (published in 5 volumes) 
 La questione socialista (1986) 
 I socialisti del mio secolo (2002)
 Scritti di storia e politica (2005)

References

Further reading
 Ciro Raia,  Gaetano Arfé. Un socialista del mio Paese, Piero Lacaita editore, Manduria-Bari, 2003

1925 births
2007 deaths
People from the Province of Naples
Italian Socialist Party politicians
Independent Left (Italy) politicians
Senators of Legislature VI of Italy
Deputies of Legislature VII of Italy
Senators of Legislature X of Italy
Italian Socialist Party MEPs
MEPs for Italy 1979–1984
Italian male journalists
20th-century Italian journalists
20th-century Italian male writers